Haripur District ("The Town of Hari") is a district in Hazara Division of Khyber Pakhtunkhwa province in Pakistan. The town of Haripur (meaning 'Hari's town') was founded in 1822 by Hari Singh Nalwa, the Commander-in-Chief of Ranjit Singh's army. Before becoming a district in 1991, Haripur had the status of a tehsil in Abbottabad District. Its headquarters is the city of Haripur.

History

Early history
The region came under the influence of the Nanda Empire of ancient India from 300 BCE, and with the rise of Chandragupta Maurya, the region came under the complete control of the Mauryan Empire. Afterward, the region was briefly and nominally controlled by the Shunga Empire. However, with the decline of the Shungas, the region passed to local Hindu and Buddhist rulers, and interrupted by foreign rulers. Many of these foreign rulers, like the Indo-Parthians, Sakas, and Kushans converted to Hinduism and Buddhism, and promoted these Indian religions throughout Central and South Asia. The region reached its height under the Buddhist ruler Kanishka the Great. After the fall of the Kushans, the region came under the control of the Gupta Empire of ancient India. During the period, Hindu and Buddhist art and architecture flourished in the area.

With the decline of the imperial Guptas, the Hindu Shahis came to rule the area. The Hindu Shahis massive forts and Hindu and Buddhist temples and monasteries around the area. The Hindu Shahi forts were known for their high towers and steep defensive walls. The Hindus also built many Hindu temples around the area, however, much of them are now in rubble. The Hindu Shahis remained in control of the area until their defeat by the Turkic Muslim army of Ghaznavids.

Turk Rule

In 1399, the Muslim warrior Timur, on his return to Kabul, stationed his Turk soldiers in Hazara to protect the important route between Kabul and Kashmir.

By 1472, Prince Shahab-ud-Din came from Kabul and established his rule over the region. Prince Shahab-ud-Din, a Turk of central Asian origin and a descendant of Amir Taimur, founded the state and named it Pakhli Sarkar and chose the Gulibagh as his capital. Their territory at that time was up to Attock as per Raja Irshad's Tarikh e Hazara. Haripur was a part of Pakhli Sarkar at that time.

In the 18th century, Turkish rule came to an end due to the increased aggression of the Swathis and their allied forces. At that time it was not called Haripur. The area was part of Lower Tanawal area of Pakhli Sarkar and ruled by Turks of Pakhli Sarkar. The last Wali of the Lower Tanawal (headquarter Sherwan) was Sultan Qiyasuddin, the younger brother of Sultan Mehmood Khurd, who was the last Turk ruler in Hazara (Pakhli Sarkar). Pakhli Sarkar got a last blow when Syed Jalal Shah commonly known as Jalal Baba conspired against his own father in Law i.e. Sultan Mehmood Khurd. Sultan was away to Delhi, when called by Aurangzeb Alamgir for some central Asian expeditions. Syed Jalal Shah took advantage of the situation and invited Swathies to attack Pakhli Sarkar to overthrow the Turks. Turks fought bravely, however, ultimately, Turks were overthrown and Turk Rule came to an end in 1703. The descendants of Turk ruler Mehmood Khurd still live in various parts of Haripur Hazara, such as Nartopa, Bayan Ahmed Ali Khan, Pharari, Behali, Manakrai, etc.

Durrani rule
When Ahmad Shah Durrani expanded his kingdom to Punjab, Hazara came under his control. Durrani considered it wise to rule the area through local tribal chiefs, especially the Tareen chiefs who remained the main administrators from around the 1760s to 1818/1819. The Durranis' rule ended abruptly in the beginning of the 19th century, circa 1819 or 1820, with the advent of the Sikhs.

Sikh rule
The Sikhs annexed Hazara in two stages: first, Lower Hazara was annexed when the Sikhs under Makhan Singh took over the plains, on the invitation of a Turk chieftain. Upper Hazara suffered a similar fate when the Sikhs took Kashmir from the Barakzai Afghans in 1819.

The town of Haripur (meaning 'Hari's town') was founded in 1822 by Hari Singh Nalwa, the Commander-in-Chief of Ranjit Singh's army. On the successful completion of his tenure as governor of Kashmir in 1821, Pakhli and Damtaur were bestowed upon Nalwa as a jagir. Tanolis were the greater threat to Sikhs. Nawab Painda Khan Tanoli of Amb State defeated Ranjit Singh near Tarbeela. As soon as Nalwa received this grant, he built the walled town of Haripur in the heart of the Haripur plain, centered on the fort of Harkishan Garh, which he encircled with a deep trench. The site selected had seen some of the fiercest fighting between Sikhs and Afghans. Despite the presence of the fort and a strong Sikh garrison, the Lahore government wasn't finally able to get full control of the Lower Hazara until they had defeated and captured and executed the Tareen chief Bostan Khan, and some others.

British India
The presence of the fort at Harkishangarh, with its four-yard thick and 16-yard high wall, eventually brought a feeling of security to the region. In 1835, Baron Heugel, a German traveler found only remnants of that wall remaining.

Haripur was the sole example of a planned town in this region until the British built Abbottabad many years later. It continued to grow, eventually becoming a city and later a district.

Haripur once bore the official name of Haripur Hazara and was the capital of Hazara until 1853, when the new capital Abbottabad was built. In March 1849, the Punjab was annexed by the British Indian Empire. Abbott later painted a noted picture of the town of Haripur and its commanding fort of Harkishangarh.

Administration
The district of Haripur was a tehsil (sub-division) of Abbottabad District, until 1992 when it became a district. One of those MPAs is elected to the National/Federal Assembly.

Currently, Haripur District is divided into three Tehsils, Haripur Tehsil, Khanpur Tehsil, Ghazi Tehsil further subdivided into 45 Union Councils of which 15 are urban Union Councils:

Ali Khan
Bagra
Baitgali Tanawal
Bakka
Bandi Sher Khan
Barkot
Beer Tanawal
Breela
Dheendah
Dingi
Ghazi
Haripur Central
Haripur North
Haripur South
Hattar
Jabri
Jatti Pind
Kalinjar Tanawal
Kakotri Tanawal
Khalabat Township
Khanpur (On 15 October 2016 the chief minister of KP announced status of tehsil to Khanpur.)
Kholian Bala
Kot Najeebullah
Kotehrra
Kundi
Lalogali Tanawal
Landarmang Tanawal
Mankrai
Maqsood
Najafpur
Nara Amaz
Pandak
Panian
Pind Hasham Khan
Pind Kamal Khan
Pharhari
Qazipur
Rehana
Sarai Saleh
Serai Niamat Khan
Sikandarpur
Sirikot
Sarian Bajwala
Sirya
Tarbela
Tofkian

Localities 
Malkiar

Provincial Assembly

Natural resources
The area is rich in natural resources and contains two reservoirs, the Tarbela Dam and Khanpur Dam. Geographically, it is the gateway to Hazara, the Hazara Division, and the Pakistani capital Islamabad.

Boundary

Geographically, the district borders Abbottabad District to the northeast, Mansehra District in the northeast, the Punjab to the southeast, the Buner to the northwest and Swabi to the west. The Federal Capital of Islamabad is adjacent to the district in the south.

Demographics
At the time of the 2017 census the district had a population of 1,001,515, of which 498,202 were males and 503,266 females. Rural population was 868,415 (86.71%) while the urban population was 133,100 (13.29%). 1,193 people in the district were from religious minorities, mainly Christians.

At the time of the 2017 census, 80.84% of the population spoke Hindko, 11.84% Pashto, 1.83% Urdu and 1.51% Punjabi as their first language.

The literacy rate in the Haripur district is 72.21%, substantially higher than the literacy rate in the region of Hazara, which is 35.2%. The female literacy rate is only 61.08% compared to male literacy of 83.07%, and urban literacy rate of 82.34% is higher than the rural rate of 70.59%.

Education
Haripur District has two government-funded postgraduate colleges, providing higher-level education, as well as four-degree colleges for women. Haripur University was established in 2012 by the efforts of Higher Education Minister Qazi Muhammad Asad.. In addition to that, the project of Pak-Austria Fachhochschule Institute of Applied Sciences and Technology has also been continuing since 2017 in Mang at Khanpur road.

In 2000–2001, Haripur had 907 government primary schools, including 656 for boys and 251 for girls. In addition to government primary schools, 166 mosque schools were in the district. The primary school population (5–9 years) consisted of 101,670 students, of which 52,240 (51.38%) were boys and 49,430 (48.61%) were girls.

The district had 83 middle schools (56 for boys and 27 for girls), during 2001.

See also

 State of Amb
 Khyber Pakhtunkhwa
Khan Zabardast Khan
Tareen tribe

References

Further reading
 Waldemar Heckel, Lawrence A. Tritle, ed (2009). Alexander the Great: A New History. Wiley-Blackwell. pp. 47–48. . https://books.google.com/?id=jbaPwpvt8ZQC&pg=PA46&lpg=PA46&dq=callisthenes+of+olynthus+conspiracy&q=callisthenes%20of%20olynthus%20conspiracy
 Tripathi (1999). History of Ancient India. Motilal Banarsidass Publ.. pp. 118–121. . https://books.google.com/?id=WbrcVcT-GbUC
 Narain, pp. 155–165
 Curtius in McCrindle, Op cit, p 192, J. W. McCrindle; History of Punjab, Vol I, 1997, p 229, Punajbi University, Patiala, (Editors): Fauja Singh, L. M. Joshi; Kambojas Through the Ages, 2005, p 134, Kirpal Singh.

Districts of Khyber Pakhtunkhwa